"Hunt for Wolverine" is a 2018 comic book storyline published by Marvel Comics, starring the character Wolverine. The storyline is the follow-up to the Death of Wolverine, and is continued with Return of Wolverine.

Premise
The plot will detail how Wolverine returned from the dead following his death in the "Death of Wolverine" storyline and how the X-Men will cope with this discovery. The lead-up will include the "Where Is Wolverine?" mini-story at the end of different comic issues.

Each of the stories has a theme to it: "Weapon Lost" has a noir theme, "The Adamantium Agenda" has an action-adventure theme, "Claws of a Killer" has a horror theme, and "Mystery in Madripoor" has a dark romance theme.

Following the "Hunt for Wolverine" storyline, Marvel released a new Wolverine series. This will be preceded by the "Return of Wolverine" miniseries.

Plot

Where is Wolverine?
Wolverine acquires the Space Infinity Gem after killing the Frost Giant Snarr that was targeting it on Loki's behalf. Meanwhile, the time-displaced Jean Grey stands before the empty adamantium shell in Wolverine's tomb that has been broken open.

Keeping his low profile, Wolverine unsuccessfully attempts to rekindle his relationship with his old friends. He's seen walking to a bar where Captain America had been playing pool, only to learn he was no longer there.

Wolverine leaves flowers with a hospitalized Jane Foster after visiting hours but does not reveal his name to the attending nurse.

Wolverine arrives at Big Ben hours after Spider-Man's confrontation with Scorpio.

Following his fight with Thing and Human Torch, a desperate Hydro-Man arrives at a campfire attempts to rob the person sitting at it, who happens to be Wolverine.

Wolverine is seen in Peru where the Avengers have just battled the forces of Grandmaster's Lethal Legion and Challenger's Black Order. He is one of the heroes frozen in stasis walking down a flight of steps in Peru, once the Avengers' Quinjet leaves.

Wolverine is attacked by minions of Ultron in the wilds of Canada. Easily dispatching them using the space stone's teleportation abilities, he is met by Loki. After losing an eye in the confrontation with Wolverine, Loki pleads unsuccessfully for the Infinity Stone.

Wolverine passes by Londell's Restaurant in Harlem, where he detects the familiar scent of Storm who had been there earlier.

Wolverine encounters a mutant-hating mob as a Sentinel is nearby.

Although Wolverine is not seen, Black Widow discovers that he has entrusted her with the Space Infinity Gem which he has hidden inside the toilet of a safe house in Madripoor that they are both familiar with.

While in Japan, Wolverine watches a broadcast of Amadeus Cho's Hulk form battling and defeating Phalkan.

At the Massachusetts Institute of Technology, Wolverine arrives at an unoccupied desk to find a long spreadsheet printout. After reading the information on the printout, he states that he will be seeing Tony Stark soon.

Main plot
The Reavers have located Wolverine's shrine and use a molecular rearranger to split open the statue only to discover it empty. The X-Men arrive promptly and handily defeat the aged cyborgs. A flashback shows how Wolverine's friends coped with Logan's death and how to deal with his funeral, as sometime shortly after the X-Men had retrieved Logan's adamantium sarcophagus from Mister Sinister, Forge had built a log cabin in Alberta, Canada to serve as a secret shrine to hold Wolverine, where Cyclops, Storm, Colossus, Beast and Mister Fantastic say their farewells. Mister Fantastic regretted not being able to be any further help to Wolverine when his healing factor was shut off. As Storm was upset at the idea of Logan remaining as a statue-like corpse, Colossus suggests to Kitty Pryde that she phase Wolverine's body out of the adamantium so that he can get a proper funeral and burial after Beast confirms that he is dead by all measurable standards known to him. Those attending the quiet ceremony are Jubilee, Colossus, Kitty Pryde, Rogue, Cyclops, Beast, Firestar, Storm, and Doop, having arrived at the secret location via the Blackbird. It is decided that the adamantium shell will be left as a memorial in the shrine. In the present, Kitty drinks a beer at Logan's unmarked grave to recount the tale of their battle with the Reavers when she notices his burial shroud entangled in the nearby trees and phases her arm into the ground to discover that Wolverine's body is no longer interred. After exhuming the grave to confirm her fears, she then rallies the X-Men and his close associates into finding him. Lady Deathstrike vows to hunt down Wolverine after she is notified via Reavers' intel of the empty state of the adamantium statue. Meanwhile, in an unknown location, Wolverine, clad entirely in black, is being commanded by an as-yet-unidentified figure who is shrouded in shadows.

Weapon Lost
The X-Men have enlisted Daredevil into looking into the disappearance of Wolverine's body. While moving through the rooftops of New York City, Daredevil runs into Nur and enlists his help into finding Wolverine's body. Though Nur was uncomfortable at first due to what happened in the fight between Inhumans and mutants, Daredevil persuaded him to help find Wolverine. In addition, he was told by Daredevil that they are not looking for the "old one," the "lady," the "blonde kid," or the "android." The next person Daredevil recruits is Misty Knight who states that she is no longer working for the NYPD. Misty states that she knows an information broker that can help them. The trail leads them to Cypher who has started translating everything on the Internet. At a diner, Cypher agrees to help them find Wolverine. Upon being handed a smartphone by Nur, Cypher finds that Wolverine has been sighted in a lot of places in the past sixty days.

High above Pennsylvania in an Attilan Security Force Skycharger, Daredevil, Cypher, Misty Knight, and Nur investigate the different sightings of Wolverine. What Cypher found on the Internet is that some people are being saved by Wolverine and some are even making out with Wolverine. Cypher starts using the smartphone to pull up every news related to Wolverine in the past 90 days. As Nur and Misty Knight discuss who is an experience detective, Daredevil noticed that Nur's heart pulse went up when he spoke Misty's name. When asked about the Attilan Security Force Skycharger going anywhere in the world by Daredevil, Nur states that the Inhumans will not be thrilled when they hear that he borrowed it to help the X-Men. He even quoted to Daredevil "but I won't tell if you won't." At Ranger Outpost Nine at Meadowlake Provincial Park in Saskatchewan, park rangers Alice and Chris are fixing their radio to arrange an airlift for the injured in their possession. At the McCarthy Medical Institute in Manhattan, Misty Knight and Nur arrive asking about the person who delivered flowers to Jane Foster. While the receptionist has no knowledge on the person's identity, Daredevil tells Misty Knight that she is not lying and they should head to the next sighting. In Phoenix, Arizona, Nur hears from a biker gang that Wolverine passed through here. In Chicago, Misty Knight sees a security guard who thought he saw Wolverine and later removed that claim from the Internet. Back at Ranger Outpost Nine, one of the people with Tom, Chris, and Alex has died as their outpost is attacked by a man with claws. Cypher informs Daredevil, Misty Knight, and Nur about the weak distress signal that came from Saskatchewan about them being attacked by a man with claws. Arriving in Saskatchewan, Daredevil, Misty Knight, and Nur investigate the area while Cypher remains on the Skycharger. They find a bunch of dead men but no sign of a woman. While they are in the woods and figure out that the culprit will pick off the weak, Cypher steps out of the Skycharger to translate the smartphone of a dead man as he is slashed in the throat by a man with claws who is familiar with the Cypher's abilities. Cypher is then on the ground holding his hands against his throat wound.

Daredevil, Misty Knight, and Nur arrive at the cabin to find Cypher on the ground as Daredevil's senses confirm that Cypher is still alive. Nur pulls out a Medical Suite, an Inhuman tech that work miracles as he plans to use it on Cypher while Daredevil and Misty keep an eye out in case Cypher's attacker returns. As Misty Knight suspects that it's Wolverine who did it, Daredevil has theories that he might be mind-controlled, gone insane, or is possessed by someone while recapping the time when the Hand controlled Wolverine into attacking him. As Daredevil, Misty Knight, and Nur get Cypher to the Skycharger, they find someone who looks like Wolverine on top of the Skycharger. Nur suggests that they get inside so that they can hold him off inside. Daredevil discovers that the Wolverine-like culprit is Albert and recalls his history of having been created by the Reavers. Nur gets Cypher into the Medical Suite. When Daredevil kicks Albert off the roof, Misty Knight's gun destroys his cloak as Albert wounds Misty before escaping into the forest. After being tripped by Daredevil, Albert grabs him by the neck and starts to ask what he did with Elsie-Dee. It took the attacks from the weapons wielded by Misty Knight, Nur, and a recovered Cypher to shut down Albert as they leave a tip on where to find him for the Canadian authorities. While flying back to New York, Cypher is recuperating from his injury and uses a smartphone taken from one of the dead forest rangers to find something that he shows to Misty Knight and Nur. Daredevil is told that Cypher's discovery is going to take them back to Chicago. They revisited the security guard who Misty spoke to and find him dead and a bomb nearby as it goes off.

Misty Knight's cybernetic arm manifested a shield big enough to protect her, Daredevil, and Nur from the explosion. Then they worked to evacuate those who couldn't get out of the burning building. Nur reveals that his eyes also work like a camera flash as he analyzed the apartment before it blew up. His analysis revealed that the security guard worked for a group called Soteira which was listed as an asset management company. Daredevil, Misty Knight, and Nur head to one of their offices in Chicago where Daredevil's radar detects the people inside purging their records. As the group crashes through the window, Nur holds the workers a gunpoint as Cypher works to see if he can stop whatever they were doing on the computer. A Level Four Killteam assigned to the floor arrives as they kill the workers as part of their purge. As Misty Knight keeps Cypher safe, Daredevil and Nur hold off the Level Four Killteam. The four of them escape after Cypher gets the information they need. Back in the Skycharger, Cypher deciphers the remaining information that Soteira didn't delete which involve Wolverine being interviewed by Soteira. When Misty Knight asks what to do next, Daredevil states that he is grateful for their help as this is no longer a missing persons case. As Nur asks what he plans to do with the drive after getting him, Misty Knight, and Cypher back to New York, Daredevil says that he is giving it to Kitty Pryde while informing her on who else is looking for Wolverine and what they are walking into. Nur recaps his wife leaving him following his Terrigenesis and tells Misty Knight that he looks forward to working with her again. While in the presence of Cypher who states that he needs help, Daredevil calls Kitty to let her know of his findings. While advised by Kitty to come in and meet with the other leaders of the search teams, he tells Kitty about the data on Soteira and states his opinion that "Wolverine should've stayed dead."

The Adamantium Agenda
Following a flashback to their New Avengers years with Wolverine where they stop a bomb in Tribeca, New York, Iron Man is told about what happened to Wolverine's body and starts to assemble Jessica Jones, Luke Cage, and Spider-Man following the latter's fight with Vulture. After arranging for someone to watch Luke and Jessica's child Danielle, they hear that the genetic material of a hero is going on sale at the black market and go undercover to investigate. This leads them to a submarine that is being held in international waters off the coast of Guam. As nobody shows their actual face at the auction, they must wear masks during the auction. When they arrive at the auction undercover that is usually attended by mercenaries, supervillains, terrorist organizations, rogue military factions, and hate groups, they find that the genetic material in question that an unidentified seller in an Iron Man mask is going to auction off is actually the genetic material of Danielle Cage much to the surprise and anger of Luke and Jessica.

In another flashback to Tribeca, Iron Man finds Wolverine's body in the rubble as he suddenly impales his head. When Spider-Man sees this and shouts Iron Man's name, Tony Stark arrived in his car and revealed that the Iron Man armor is remote-controlled. After Wolverine comes to his senses, he asks Iron Man what he would've done with his body if anything was to happen to him. While Iron Man states that he would've promised to give him a funeral, Wolverine states to Iron Man that he better make sure nobody gets his hands on his corpse for their own experiments. Back in the present, Jessica and Luke are in shock that the auction has the genetic material of their daughter. The unidentified seller informs those that are present that Danielle Cage is the daughter of Luke Cage and Jessica Jones. The masked attendees hoped that the DNA would be from an actual hero. As the seller claims that Danielle will one day inherit her parents' powers, a masked Tony Stark begins the auction at $30,000. As nobody else bids on the DNA of Danielle, it is sold to Tony Stark as a chunk of the Z1 is next up to auction. As Tony Stark is not up for bidding on something else, he meets with the seller in a room for the transaction. The transaction is crashed by Mister Sinister who is seeking to reclaim the genetic material of Wolverine that was stolen from him and the resulting attack causes a hole in the submarine. Spider-Man uses his web and Luke Cage plug up the hole. As Iron Man works to keep Mister Sinister from killing the seller, he is assisted by one of the disguised auction attendees who turns out to be Laura Kinney (X-23/Wolverine) as she slices off Mister Sinister's left hand.

In another flashback to Tribeca, the radiation levels are stabilizing as it was engineered to dissipate. Controlling the Iron Man armor, Tony Stark speaks to Wolverine who mentions that Iron Man and Captain America screwed up the "Civil War" and that they need to stay together for the world. While cutting the external channel on his glasses so that Jessica Jones, Luke Cage, and Spider-Man can't listen in, Tony is told by Wolverine that he knows what had happened here. Back in the present, Mister Sinister is in pain after his left hand was cut off as he continues the attack. Not wanting another hull breach, Iron Man orders Spider-Man and Jessica Jones to contain Mister Sinister. After breaking free from Spider-Man's webs and causing Iron Man to get Jessica out of range of the attack, Mister Sinister goes to target the seller again until Laura cuts off his right hand. After Mister Sinister escapes, the submarine starts to go down as Iron Man orders Jessica to keep an eye on the seller while Spider-Man and Laura round up everyone to be evacuated. As Iron Man raises the submarine to the surface of the ocean, Spider-Man and Laura evacuate the auction attendees who are loaded onto South Korea's National Intelligence Service Helicarrier. While Luke Cage still couldn't believe that they left him to seal the breach, Jessica states that he was pretty useful at that. While the auction attendees are arrested, Tony Stark has a general prepare a room to question the seller of Danielle's DNA. When being interrogated, the seller states that his name is Declan Fay who states that Mister Sinister is putting together a database of DNA even though he doesn't know whose DNA it is. Laura confirms that he's right. Declan states that a handful of people were selected to help build this database as he directs them to the Kerguelen Islands. Tony Stark later tells Jessica, Luke, Spider-Man, and Laura that the islands in question are also known as the "Desolation Islands" which is one of the most isolated islands on Earth. Tony also states that need to find a way to approach the most without setting off Mister Sinister's defenses. To arrive small enough so that they won't get detected, Iron Man provides Jessica, Luke, Spider-Man, and Laura with their own Iron Man armors with stealth tech. Entering the hangar, Iron Man's group fights some armed guards. When they reach the room that the database is in, they find swabs of DNA while looking to see if Wolverine's DNA is among them. They discover that Mister Sinister has collected the genetic make-up of every person on Earth.

In another flashback to Tribeca, Wolverine tells Jessica Jones, Luke Cage, and Spider-Man that he told Iron Man to look after his body when he died while listing Jessica, Luke, and Spider-Man as his "insurance." In the present, Iron Man states that Mister Sinister has the genetic make-up of every person on Earth. While Iron Man objects to Laura wanting to destroy the genetic make-up, Spider-Man discovers on the database that there aren't any DNA of mutants. Just then, the group is attacked by more armed guards. When they find a room filled with dead personnel, Jessica states that Mister Sinister would never kill his own people and that someone else is behind this as Jessica is unfamiliar with their symbols. Using the database inside, Iron Man states that the digital mutant database is contained here. When Spider-Man suggests they destroy the databases, Mister Sinister arrives and attacks them. After being stabbed by Laura, Mister Sinister admits to Iron Man that a killteam showed up and stole his work. When Laura asks if he has Wolverine's body, Mister Sinister states that he doesn't have it as he has a piece of him in his database. When Mister Sinister claims to Iron Man that he is a man of science and to ignore his achievements would be scientific terrorism, Iron Man recalls the discussion he had with Wolverine again where another discussion had Wolverine telling Iron Man that the bomb had Stark Industries' logo on it where Iron Man states that he never used that weapon. Wolverine tells Iron Man to see people before potential. Iron Man has no choice but to have Jessica Jones, Luke Cage, Spider-Man, and Laura destroy the database. Later at Luke and Jessica's home, the group meets up with Iron Fist who was babysitting Danielle Cage. Tony Stark informs Laura that he found some information about her on Mister Sinister's database that indicates she contains more of Sarah Kinney's DNA, making her Sarah and Logan's biological daughter. As Laura sits down on a chair and holds Danielle, Tony informs Jessica and Luke that he saw the DNA of an unknown X-Men member who isn't a mutant. He states that the X-Men have a genetically-altered sleeper agent among them.

Claws of a Killer
One week ago in Maybelle, Arizona, people are watching a sports game at the bar when the power goes out. Two people inspect the source of the power outage at the power station when a worker named Larry doesn't answer his phone. They find that Wolverine has killed Larry. After killing the two men, Wolverine informs Soteira Killteam Nine that the Maybelle Emitter installation is complete and they may begin to secure and document the results. Wolverine presses a button on a strange device causing the green orb to glow brightly throughout the entire building. Meanwhile, in Chester's Bar in Manhattan, Daken is seen with Sabretooth and Lady Deathstrike. Daken learns from Lady Deathstrike about what the Reavers have informed her as Sabretooth states the rumors that Wolverine may be alive. Four days ago in Maybelle, the Soteira Killteam Nine investigates the dead population. Daken, Lady Deathstrike and Sabretooth agree to find Wolverine dead or alive to ensure his death remains certain. When the three of them arrive in Maybelle, Daken finds members of Soteira Killteam Nine there. Just then, Daken is attacked and bitten by the zombies of the civilians and find that he is not healing fast. The zombies begin to swarm over Daken.

Soteira Killteam Nine guns down the zombies swarming over Daken and take him into custody. Sabretooth and Lady Deathstrike continue searching Maybelle for Wolverine when they are attacked by a family of zombies. One of them bites Sabretooth. Lady Deathstrike gets him away from the horde as both of them wonder where the zombies came from. As they get to their car, it suddenly explodes. As Daken regains consciousness, he hears Soitera Killteam Nine reporting that they have the son of Wolverine in their clutches. Daken brings out his claws as he asks who they are and where Wolverine is. Back at the burning car, Sabretooth starts running and finds that his zombie bite is not healing. Sabretooth comes across more zombies as he starts killing them with Lady Deathstrike not far behind him. Both of them take refuge in a garage. Daken continues to fight the Soteira Killteam Nine member as one of them confirms Daken's presence. Daken evades their firepower and jumps out the window.

After landing on the ground, Daken sees a bunch of zombies coming towards him. He runs and gets on top of the building. When on the roof, he falls through and reunites with Sabretooth and Lady Deathstrike who were taking refuge in the building. He informs them about what he knows about Soteira and suspects that the green glowing device is the cause of the zombie outbreak. As Soteira is planning to burn the entire town, Daken tells Lady Deathstrike that they need to head back to the power station that he was held in and destroy the device. While fighting past the zombies and the soldiers of Soteira Killteam Six, Lady Deathstrike discovers that one of the soldiers is her late father Lord Dark Wind who stabs her in the left shoulder. As Daken defends Lady Deathstrike from Lord Dark Wind, Sabretooth identifies the other soldier as his late son Graydon Creed. Daken is then impaled through the heart by Lord Dark Wind. Sabretooth carries Daken away from the attackers. As Sabretooth engages his son, Graydon states that there is 10 minutes left before the clean sweep.

As Sabretooth fights his son Graydon Creed, he tries to get answers out of him on how he is back from the dead. Meanwhile, Lady Deathstrike recovers and knocks her father down as she figures out that it was his adamantium signature she was tracking. Soteira Killteam Nine is contacted to let them know that there is 7 minutes left before the clean sweep. After Lord Dark Wind's left hand is sliced off by Lady Deathstrike, she then stabs her father in the neck as she suspects that the blade on his sword is made of adamantium. Then she stabs Graydon in the neck while warning Sabretooth that they have six minutes left before Maybelle is burned to the ground. After being told that Daken is dead, Lady Deathstrike runs with Sabretooth as they arrive at the building where the glowing device is and destroys it. The next day, a Soteira group finds Daken's body and claims it. At a diner in Arizona, Sabretooth and Lady Deathstrike carjack a person as Sabretooth suggests that Lady Deathstrike gets a new hand from her fellow Reavers. A Soteira group loads Daken's body into their airplane.

Mystery in Madripoor
Kitty Pryde gathers together Jubilee, Psylocke, Rogue, and Storm as they start to look for Wolverine's body. As they suspect that Magneto excavated Wolverine's body, they fly to Madripoor with the aid of Domino flying the airplane to keep them off the grid. When they arrive, they are confronted by Magneto where Kitty Pryde states that he did not return any of her messages and that they got to talk about Wolverine. Magneto will speak to them at the King's Impresario Restaurant in Hightown at 10:00 PM which he won't wear his helmet to so that Psylocke can verify what he has to say. Unbeknownst to Kitty Pryde's group, they are being overshadowed by Mindblast. At the Princess' Bar where Wolverine once ran it under the alias of Patch, Kitty Pryde learns what Wolverine taught her about a safe place to reside in the meantime and quotes "Yashida" causing the bartender Mr. Halliday to take them to a secret basement room. After flashing back to a discussion she had with Wolverine, Storm holds the cat head peace offering that she once gave Wolverine. Reading a nearby letter from Carol Danvers to Wolverine, Rogue recalls how Ms. Marvel was angry at her for once stealing her powers and how Professor X gave Rogue a home at the X-Mansion. Looking at a samurai armor, Psylocke recalls her duel with Wolverine. After getting into some dresses that would enable them to blend in to Madripoor's night life, Kitty Pryde's group head to the King's Impresario Restaurant where they meet up with Magneto. Unfortunately, the person they were talking to was not Magneto and was actually Mindblast in disguise who subdues Storm as Viper appears where she hasn't been seen since Hydra's short-lived reign over the United States and is now in the company of the Femme Fatales. Viper unleashes Knockout on Rogue, Bloodlust on Domino, and Snake Whip on Jubilee while Sapphire Styx crashes Psylocke's fight with Mindblast to drain her energy. Kitty Pryde works to evacuate her group. When Snake Whip states that Kitty Pryde won't get far, Viper admits that he wanted to take care of them in one strike. A defeated Rogue and Storm are taken captive while Sapphire Styx continues to drain Psylocke's energy.

After phasing herself, Jubilee, and Domino into the sewers of Lowtown, Kitty tends to Domino's injury as Jubilee asks what they are going to do when they deal with Viper and the Femme Fatales. In another part of Madripoor, Viper congratulates the Femme Fatales for their work as they now have Psylocke, Rogue, and Storm as their prisoners. Mindblast suggests that they put a bounty on the ones that escaped stating that every gang member in Lowtown will be looking for them. Viper states that she will discuss with her client on where to proceed next and to deposit Rogue and Storm to the client as "special guests." When Mindblast states that Viper is paranoid, Knockout tells her to let her as she will do her job and they will do their job. It is also shown that the Femme Fatales have Magneto as their prisoner after Mindblast messed him up with Sapphire Styx's help. Mindblast also mentioned that Viper's benefactor also enhanced Mindblast's abilities with some technology that are greater than she imagined. As Viper gives the status report to a representative of her client, she mentions that Sapphire Styx is still draining off of Psylocke just like she did with Magneto. The representative tells Viper that Sapphire Styx tends to prefer the life force of the mutants and tells Viper to focus on delivering the package as all that they are serves the will of Soteira. As Snake Whip asks if they are going to ignore Sapphire Styx' vampiric appetite, Viper says that they have to obey the representative's orders and "let the @#$%& feed." Meanwhile, Sapphire Styx still has Psylocke in her possession as she states that Psylocke's soul is magnificent as it could keep her revitalized for years only to sense that she is dead. Back in the hidden storeroom in the Princess Bar, Kitty Pryde shoots down Jubilee's suggestion to send an S.O.S. to the X-Mansion since Madripoor monitors every transmission enough to pinpoint them. When Domino suggests asking Tyger Tiger for help due to her being a rival of Viper, Kitty Pryde states that she is a loose cannon, a former lover of Wolverine, and can't be trusted after trying to kill him. She then comes up with a plan for them to hide in plain sight like Wolverine did. Arriving at the Hightown casino called Wheelers and Dealers, Kitty Pryde, Domino, and Jubilee see Bloodlust with a man causing Jubilee to make a scene by attacking Bloodlust. Kitty Pryde abducts the man as Domino beats up Bloodlust. 17 minutes later, the man introduces himself as a high roller and mathematician named Stenya Ubacowits who was hired to help in the flight trajectory of a satellite which he agrees to take them to. Meanwhile, Rogue and Storm regain consciousness as Storm's claustrophobia brings a storm to Madripoor. Sapphire Styx comments that she hasn't felt rain that primal for decades. As Sapphire gloats to Psylocke that she died to soon, she is surprised to see what appears to be Wolverine in his Patch alias sitting near Psylocke as he plans to dish out the proper punishment on her.

Following Domino's flashback to her time with Wolverine, she, Kitty Pryde, and Jubilee reach a secure location with Stenya Ubacowits as their captive. As Domino makes sure that Viper's satellite stays grounded, Kitty Pryde and Jubilee head off to find where Psylocke, Rogue, and Storm are held. Meanwhile, Viper is contacted by a representative of Soteira who was displeased that the launch was delayed by a torrential rainstorm and suggest that they launch before sunrise. While reluctantly taking the representative's suggestion, Viper and Snake Whip check up on Sapphire Styx who knocks down Snake Whip and claims that Wolverine's Patch alias is present even though Sapphire is the only one who can see him. Viper calls Knockout and Mindblast away from the prisoners to help deal with Sapphire. Before they can meet up with Viper, Knockout and Mindblast are ambushed by Kitty and Jubilee. When Domino and Stenya arrive at the launch site of the satellite where Rogue and Storm are being loaded into, Bloodlust catches up to them and stabs Stenya before fighting Domino. Meanwhile, Kitty phases through the equipment on Mindblast's back that enhanced her psychic powers. This enables Magneto to recover and begin his payback. As Snake Whip recovers, she starts to see Patch too as Viper gives orders to begin the launch now. When Magneto starts to attack Mindblast, Kitty tells Magneto that they have to stop the rocket. As Magneto works to stop the rocket and Domino defeats Mindblast, Kitty Pryde, Domino, and Jubilee catch up to Sapphire as Kitty figures out that Psylocke is playing a mind trick on her. Psylocke's voice is heard quoting "NO MORE SOULS" as Sapphire's body begins to shatter.

In Sapphire Styx's body, Psylocke's soul starts to see her life before she merged with Revanche as she realizes that she is in Sapphire's body. While fighting passed the souls of Sapphire's victims, Psylocke finds a soul sliver of Wolverine which leads to her overpowering Sapphire from within. After Sapphire shatters, Psylocke appears before her teammates. As Magneto is still recovering from what Mindblast put him through, he is unable to keep the rocket containing Rogue and Storm from launching. While Kitty Pryde phases into the rocket, Psylocke joins the battle against the Femme Fatales where she knocks out Bloodlust while Jubilee fights Knockout. Snake Whip goes on the attack while Viper maintains the higher ground. While Kitty frees Rogue and Storm, Psylocke uses an illusion to trick Snake Whip into crashing into the ground. Once on the ground, Rogue takes some of Knockout's strength to add to hers enough to render Knockout unconscious while Domino gets Snake Whip to surrender. After some persuasion from Kitty and Domino, Magneto spares Mindblast's life and leaves her as a gift for helping him to escape. While Magneto denied any knowledge of taking Wolverine's body, he works to destroy the launch site and purge Madripoor of Viper's criminal empire. Back in the Princess Bar's secret room, Domino understands why Wolverine had interests in Madripoor and states that he is still dead. Storm comments that death is an intermission than a conclusion. When Rogue states that they weren't able to find Wolverine's body, Kitty states that she got a confession from Snake Whip after the Femme Fatales were locked up that Soteira had hired them and Viper to find Wolverine. Snake Whip told her the name of that group in exchange for a lighter sentence. Kitty states that Carol Danvers and her team in the Alpha Flight space program have been tracking the rocket since they lost it while Jubilee went to check up on Psylocke. Outside, Psylocke mentioned to Jubilee that she used the soul power left behind by Sapphire to create a new body while mentioning how Dr. Synne, S.T.R.I.K.E., Mojo, and the Hand have used her mind and body for their own purposes. As some people are shown cleaning out Viper's penthouse, a somehow-revived Revanche silently comes up on one of the workers and speaks in Japanese where she would like to ask him a few questions.

Dead Ends
In Spain, 16-year old Antonio Fernandez from Barcelona is stated by the narrator to be special. In New York City, Tony Stark makes his way through the city and arrives with Daredevil at the X-Mansion in Central Park. They are let in by Kitty Pryde as Tony and Daredevil learned what happened to Psylocke. When in the conference hall, Kitty, Tony, and Daredevil review how there had been a lot of stuff being shot into outer space. Tony states how Mister Sinister had a lot of DNA samples like the DNA samples of Demolition Man and Doctor Doom which are now destroyed while also mentioning that someone stole a copy of his work. While Daredevil talks about a corporation that used Wolverine for evil purposes, Kitty talks about how she had been contacted by Sabretooth on how he and Lady Deathstrike encountered zombies and what happened to Daken. Kitty states that they are all connected to Soteira. Daredevil states that Soteira was the company that had records on Wolverine, Tony mentions that their logo was on the group that stole a copy of Mister Sinister's work, and Kitty mentions about having Viper oversee their operations in Madripoor. Thanks to Daredevil's senses, Tony and Kitty find out that kinetic weapons strong enough to act like a nuclear weapon are falling to Earth. Kitty Pryde gives out the orders that involves Nightcrawler evacuating the school, the flying X-Men head up and see what they can do, and for the students to head to the assigned crisis rally point. Tony Stark becomes Iron Man with the help of F.R.I.D.A.Y. and heads into the sky with Firestar and Storm. With Daredevil's help, Kitty knows that two students haven't been evacuated as Daredevil goes to get them. Iron Man identifies the four projectiles approaching the X-Mansion as solid tungstens. While Firestar, Storm, and Iron Man use their attacks to stop the three projectiles, the fourth gets by them as Iron Man works to intercept before it reaches the X-Mansion as Kitty advises Nightcrawler to get away. As F.R.I.D.A.Y. tells Iron Man that they can't catch up to the fourth one in time, Kitty Pryde works to phase the ground so that it would hit the magma layer of the Earth instead. Just then, a bespectacled bald-headed man appears. While Daredevil can't hear a heartbeat, he turns down Nightcrawler's theory of him being an android. The mysterious man states that he needed a distraction so that he can set up 10 corpses on their property. When he states that he'll let her explain, a hologram of a costumed person appears identifying herself as Persephone thanks the assembled heroes for saving the world many times and states that she has Wolverine who is doing good work while also being behind Soteira. Persephone then talks about the bodies starting with Antonio Fernandez. Persephone states that the copy of Mister Sinister's work contains the future's mutants. Before disappearing, Persephone advises them to stop looking or the ten bodies before them are just the beginning. The mysterious person then collapses as Daredevil claims that he was dead the moment the transmission ended. As Storm states that Cerebro can only detect manifested mutants, Iron Man asks Kitty Pryde what her next course of action is. Meanwhile, in Persephone's lair, she muses on the effectiveness of her performance towards heroes of such renown as the X-Men and Iron Man, hoping that Tony Stark in particular would understand her intentions. As she removes her gloves, she casually comments on her distaste in the use of killing children to make an impression. Tethered by energy ropes and suspended by his arms and legs before her, Wolverine reacts angrily to the callous statement and extracts his claws, which are shown to be glowing red hot. Persephone states that he need not worry, as this will all be over soon.

Titles

Where is Wolverine?
The titles of this lead-up are listed in order of appearance:

 Marvel Legacy #1
 Captain America #697
 The Mighty Thor #703
 Amazing Spider-Man #794
 Marvel 2-In-One #3
 Avengers  #680
 Infinity Countdown Prime #1
 Black Panther  #170
 X-Men: Red #2
 Infinity Countdown #1
 Incredible Hulk #714
 Invincible Iron Man #598

Main plot
 Hunt for Wolverine #1

Tie-ins
 Hunt for Wolverine: Mystery in Madripoor #1-4
 Hunt for Wolverine: The Adamantium Agenda #1-4
 Hunt for Wolverine: The Claws of a Killer #1-4
 Hunt for Wolverine: Weapon Lost #1-4
 Hunt for Wolverine: Dead Ends

Collected issues

References

Marvel Comics storylines
2018 in comics